Jean-Pierre Batut (born Paris 3 July 1954) is a French bishop and theologian. Appointed bishop of Blois (22 November 2014) and installed there on 11 January 2015, he served in the Issy-lès-Moulineaux seminary near Paris, and as Curé of Ste. Jeanne de Chantal church in the XVIe Arrondissement of Paris before being appointed auxiliary bishop in Lyons (with the title of Ressiana).

Career 
Hitherto best known as a theologian, his doctoral thesis explored the doctrine of divine omnipotence in patristic thought prior to the Council of Nicaea (325) and its publication in 2009 as 'Pantocrator' was well received.

According to French and Italian newspaper reports his appointment as bishop of Metz in the Concordat zone of Alsace-Moselle in eastern France in 2013 appears to have been overruled by the French Minister of Interior. A question on this point was asked in the French parliament on 22 October 2013

In April 2015 bishop Batut criticized President Hollande's reference to 'Egyptian citizens (ressortissants égyptiens) massacred in Libya', a euphemism followed abundantly in French official and journalistic sources and intended to avoid reference to Christians being killed but which has now been abandoned by the French élite.

Publication

Pantocrator."Dieu le Père tout-puissant" dans la théologie prénicéenne (Collection des Etudes Augustiniennes, série Antiquité 189, institut des Etudes Augustiniennes), Brepols 2009

See also
 Catholic Church in France
 List of the Roman Catholic dioceses of France

References

 Conférence des évêques de France, 2014/11/22
 La Croix, 2014/11/22
 Le Républicain Lorrain, 2013/10/08
 le Loir, 04/2015

1954 births
Living people
Auxiliary bishops of Lyon
21st-century Roman Catholic bishops in France